Dosulepin, also known as dothiepin and sold under the brand name Prothiaden among others, is a tricyclic antidepressant (TCA) which is used in the treatment of depression. Dosulepin was once the most frequently prescribed antidepressant in the United Kingdom, but it is no longer widely used due to its relatively high toxicity in overdose without therapeutic advantages over other TCAs. It acts as a serotonin–norepinephrine reuptake inhibitor (SNRI) and also has other activities including antihistamine, antiadrenergic, antiserotonergic, anticholinergic, and sodium channel-blocking effects.

Medical uses
Dosulepin is used for the treatment of major depressive disorder. There is clear evidence of the efficacy of dosulepin in psychogenic facial pain, though the drug may be needed for up to a year.

Contraindications
Contraindications include:

 Epilepsy as it can lower the seizure threshold
 TCAs should not be used concomitantly or within 14 days of treatment with monoamine oxidase inhibitors due to the risk for serotonin syndrome
 Acute recovery phase following myocardial infarction as TCAs may produce conduction defects and arrhythmias
 Liver failure
 Hypersensitivity to dosulepin

Side effects
Common adverse effects:

 Drowsiness
 Extrapyramidal symptoms
 Tremor
 
 Disorientation
 Dizziness
 Paresthesias
 Alterations to ECG patterns
 Dry mouth
 Sweating
 Urinary retention
 Hypotension
 Postural hypotension
 Tachycardia
 Palpitations
 Arrhythmias
 Conduction defects
 Increased or decreased libido
 Nausea
 Vomiting
 Constipation
 Blurred vision

Less common adverse effects:

 Disturbed concentration
 Delusions
 Hallucinations
 Anxiety
 Fatigue
 Headaches
 Restlessness
 Excitement
 Insomnia
 Hypomania
 Nightmares
 Peripheral neuropathy
 Ataxia
 Incoordination
 Seizures
 Paralytic ileus
 Hypertension
 Heart block
 Myocardial infarction
 Stroke
 Gynecomastia (swelling of breast tissue in males)
 Testicular swelling
 Impotence
 Epigastric distress
 Abdominal cramps
 Parotid swellings
 Diarrhea
 Stomatitis (swelling of the mouth)
 Black tongue
 Peculiar taste sensations
 Cholestatic jaundice
 Altered liver function
 Hepatitis (swelling of the liver)
 Skin rash
 Urticaria (hives)
 Photosensitisation
 Skin blisters
 Angioneurotic edema
 Weight loss
 Urinary frequency
 Mydriasis
 Weight gain
 Hyponatremia (low blood sodium)
 Movement disorders
 Dyspepsia (indigestion)
 Increased intraocular pressure
 Changes in blood sugar levels

 Thrombocytopenia (an abnormally low number of platelets in the blood. This makes one more susceptible to bleeds)
 Eosinophilia (an abnormally high number of eosinophils in the blood) 
 Agranulocytosis (a dangerously low number of white blood cells in the blood leaving one open to potentially life-threatening infections)
 Galactorrhea (lactation that is unassociated with breastfeeding and lactation)

Overdose

The symptoms and the treatment of an overdose are largely the same as for the other TCAs. Dosulepin may be particularly toxic in overdose compared to other TCAs. The onset of toxic effects is around 4–6 hours after dosulepin is ingested. In order to minimise the risk of overdose it is advised that patients only receive a limited number of tablets at a time so as to limit their risk of overdosing. It is also advised that patients are not prescribed any medications that are known to increase the risk of toxicity in those receiving dosulepin due to the potential for mixed overdoses. The medication should also be kept out of reach of children.

Interactions
Dosulepin can potentiate the effects of alcohol and at least one death has been attributed to this combination. TCAs potentiate the sedative effects of barbiturates, tranquilizers and  depressants. Guanethidine and other adrenergic neuron blocking drugs can have their antihypertensive effects blocked by dosulepin. Sympathomimetics may potentiate the sympathomimetic effects of dosulepin. Due to the anticholinergic and antihistamine effects of dosulepin anticholinergic and antihistamine medications may have their effects potentiated by dosulepin and hence these combinations are advised against. Dosulepin may have its postural hypotensive effects potentiated by diuretics. Anticonvulsants may have their efficacy reduced by dosulepin due to its ability to reduce the seizure threshold.

Pharmacology

Pharmacodynamics

Dosulepin is a reuptake inhibitor of the serotonin transporter (SERT) and the norepinephrine transporter (NET), thereby acting as an SNRI. It is also an antagonist of the histamine H1 receptor, α1-adrenergic receptor, serotonin 5-HT2 receptors, and muscarinic acetylcholine receptors (mACh), as well as a blocker of voltage-gated sodium channels (VGSCs). The antidepressant effects of dosulepin are thought to be due to inhibition of the reuptake of norepinephrine and possibly also of serotonin.

Dosulepin has three metabolites, northiaden (desmethyldosulepin), dosulepin sulfoxide, and northiaden sulfoxide, which have longer terminal half-lives than that of dosulepin itself. However, whereas northiaden has potent activity similarly to dosulepin, the two sulfoxide metabolites have dramatically reduced activity. They have been described as essentially inactive, and are considered unlikely to contribute to either the therapeutic effects or side effects of dosulepin. Relative to dosulepin, northiaden has reduced activity as a serotonin reuptake inhibitor, antihistamine, and anticholinergic and greater potency as a norepinephrine reuptake inhibitor, similarly to other secondary amine TCAs. Unlike the sulfoxide metabolites, northiaden is thought to play an important role in the effects of dosulepin.

Although Heal & Cheetham (1992) reported relatively high Ki values of 12 and 15 nM for dosulepin and northiaden at the rat α2-adrenergic receptor and suggested that antagonism of the receptor could be involved in the antidepressant effects of dosulepin, Richelson & Nelson (1984) found a low KD of only 2,400 nM for dosulepin at this receptor using human brain tissue. This suggests that it in fact has low potency for this action, similarly to other TCAs.

Pharmacokinetics
Dosulepin is readily absorbed from the small intestine and is extensively metabolized on first-pass through the liver into its chief active metabolite, northiaden. Peak plasma concentrations of between 30.4 and 279 ng/mL (103–944 nmol/L) occur within 2–3 hours of oral administration. It is distributed in breast milk and crosses the placenta and blood–brain barrier. It is highly bound to plasma proteins (84%), and has a whole-body elimination half-life of 51 hours.

Chemistry
Dosulepin is a tricyclic compound, specifically a dibenzothiepine, and possesses three rings fused together with a side chain attached in its chemical structure. It is the only TCA with a dibenzothiepine ring system to have been marketed. The drug is a tertiary amine TCA, with its side chain-demethylated metabolite northiaden (desmethyldosulepin) being a secondary amine. Other tertiary amine TCAs include amitriptyline, imipramine, clomipramine, doxepin, and trimipramine. Dosulepin exhibits (E) and (Z) stereoisomerism like doxepin but in contrast the pure E or trans isomer is used medicinally. The drug is used commercially as the hydrochloride salt; the free base is not used.

History
Dosulepin was developed by SPOFA. It was patented in 1962 and first appeared in the literature in 1962. The drug was first introduced for medical use in 1969, in the United Kingdom.

Society and culture

Generic names
Dothiepin is the former  of the drug while dothiepin hydrochloride is the former  and remains the current . Its generic name in Spanish and Italian and its  are dosulepina, in French and its  are dosulépine, and in Latin is dosulepinum.

Brand names
Dosulepin is marketed throughout the world mainly under the brand name Prothiaden. It is or has been marketed under a variety of other brand names as well, including Altapin, Depresym, Dopress, Dothapax, Dothep, Idom, Prepadine, Protiaden, Protiadene, Thaden, and Xerenal.

Availability
Dosulepin is marketed throughout Europe (as Prothiaden, Protiaden, and Protiadene), Australia (as Dothep and Prothiaden), New Zealand (as Dopress) and South Africa (as Thaden). It is also available in Japan, Hong Kong, Taiwan, India, Singapore, and Malaysia. The drug is not available in the United States or Canada.

References

Alpha-1 blockers
CYP2D6 inhibitors
Dimethylamino compounds
Analgesics
Antihistamines
Dibenzothiepines
Muscarinic antagonists
Serotonin receptor antagonists
Serotonin–norepinephrine reuptake inhibitors
Sodium channel blockers
Tricyclic antidepressants